Beth David Hospital was one of a series of medical services that owned and operated the 1926-built 9-story building at 161 East Ninetieth Street in Manhattan. Their purchase of the building facilitated plans by the prior occupant, Manhattan General Hospital, to build an 11-story structure.

By mid-1963 Beth David was closed.

History
The roots of Beth David Hospital can be traced to the incorporation on November 29, 1886, of the Yorkville Dispensary for Women and Children, located at 246-248 East 82nd Street. From there:
 In April 1912 they moved to 1822-1828 Lexington Avenue and 113th Street.  
 In June 1913 Beth David Hospital celebrated for an entire week their having moved to a newly built facility.

 In 1934 Beth David purchased the 161 East 90th Street building. Located in Yorkville, this 9-story structure had previously housed the Pan American Hospital.
 In 1957 they moved to their last location, 321 East 42nd Street.
 They changed their name to Grand Central Hospital on July 3, 1959.
 They closed late 1962 or early 1963.

References

External links
 history of the 161 East 90th Street building Beth David Hospital bought in 1934

Defunct hospitals in Manhattan